3247 Di Martino is a dark Nysa family asteroid from the inner regions of the asteroid belt. It was discovered on 30 December 1981, by American astronomer Edward Bowell at Lowell's Anderson Mesa Station near Flagstaff, Arizona, in the United States. It was named for Italian astronomer Mario di Martino.

Orbit and classification 

Di Martino is member of the Nysa–Polana complex, one of the largest asteroid families. Its low albedo (see below) it likely belongs to the Polana family within the larger Nysa–Polana complex. The asteroid orbits the Sun in the inner main-belt at a distance of 2.1–2.7 AU once every 3 years and 8 months (1,339 days; semi-major axis of 2.38 AU). Its orbit has an eccentricity of 0.13 and an inclination of 4° with respect to the ecliptic.

Naming 

This minor planet was named after Mario di Martino (born 1947), Italian astronomer and photometrist of lightcurves at the Turin Observatory. The official naming proposed by the discoverer. The citation was prepared by Alain Harris and published by the Minor Planet Center on 14 April 1987.

Physical characteristics 

Di Martino is an assumed S-type asteroid, while its low albedo indicates a carbonaceous composition.

Rotation period 

Three rotational lightcurve of Di Martino have been obtained from photometric observations by French amateur astronomer Pierre Antonini and at the Palomar Transient Factory and Haute Provence Observatory. Lightcurve analysis gave a rotation period of 5.445 hours with a consolidated brightness amplitude between 0.32 and 0.51 magnitude, indicative of a somewhat elongated shape.

In 2016, a modeled lightcurve gave a concurring sidereal period of 5.44517 hours using photometric data from a large international collaboration of astronomers. The study also determined two spin axes of (53.0°, −70.0°) and (231.0°, −75.0°) in ecliptic coordinates (λ, β).

Diameter and albedo 

According to the surveys carried out by the Infrared Astronomical Satellite IRAS, the Japanese Akari satellite and the NEOWISE mission of NASA's Wide-field Infrared Survey Explorer, Di Martino measures between 11.267 and 15.60 kilometers in diameter and its surface has an albedo between 0.05 and 0.0925. The Collaborative Asteroid Lightcurve Link derives an albedo of 0.0540 and a diameter of 13.72 kilometers based on an absolute magnitude of 13.1.

References

External links 
 Lightcurve Database Query (LCDB), at www.minorplanet.info
 Dictionary of Minor Planet Names, Google books
 Asteroids and comets rotation curves, CdR – Geneva Observatory, Raoul Behrend
 Discovery Circumstances: Numbered Minor Planets (1)-(5000) – Minor Planet Center
 
 

003247
Discoveries by Edward L. G. Bowell
Named minor planets
19811230